Igarassu may refer to:
Igarassu, Pernambuco, a city in state of Pernambuco
Igaraçu River, a river in state of Piaui
Igaraçu do Tietê, a municipality in the state of São Paulo
Igarassu River, Pernambuco, a river in state of Pernambuco